Idrissa Kouyaté (born 27 April 1991) is an Ivorian professional footballer who plays as a forward.

Performance with Al Ahed in 2017/18 :
Lebanese premier League 2017/18 winner |
Reached the zonal semi-final in the AFC Cup Competition (in action) .

References

External links 
 
 

1991 births
Living people
Ivorian footballers
Ivorian expatriate footballers
Ivorian expatriate sportspeople in Tunisia
Ivorian expatriate sportspeople in Belarus
Ivorian expatriate sportspeople in Kazakhstan
Expatriate footballers in Tunisia
Expatriate footballers in Belarus
Expatriate footballers in Lebanon
Expatriate footballers in Kazakhstan
Tunisian Ligue Professionnelle 1 players
Belarusian Premier League players
Lebanese Premier League players
Kazakhstan Premier League players
Africa Sports d'Abidjan players
CS Sfaxien players
FC Dynamo Brest players
Al Ahed FC players
FC Akzhayik players
US Monastir (football) players
Al-Nahda Club (Oman) players
Association football forwards